The 2012 Bryant Bulldogs football team represented Bryant University in the 2012 NCAA Division I FCS football season. They were led by ninth year head coach Marty Fine and played their home games at Bulldog Stadium. They are a member of the Northeast Conference. They finished the season 4–7, 4–4 in Northeast Conference play to finish in a tie for fourth place.

Schedule

Source: Schedule

References

Bryant
Bryant Bulldogs football seasons
Bryant Bulldogs football